Oscar Hullgren (10 August 1869 – 27 April 1948) was a Swedish painter. His work was part of the painting event in the art competition at the 1932 Summer Olympics.

References

1869 births
1948 deaths
20th-century Swedish painters
Swedish male painters
Olympic competitors in art competitions
People from Hultsfred Municipality
20th-century Swedish male artists